The South Eastern Railway (abbreviated SER) is one of the 19 railway zones in India and Part of Eastern Railways. It is headquartered at Garden Reach, Kolkata, West Bengal, India. It comprises  Adra railway division, Chakradharpur railway division, Kharagpur railway division and Ranchi railway division.

History

Predecessor
The Bengal Nagpur Railway (BNR) Company was incorporated in 1887 to take over from the Nagpur Chhattisgarh Railway and to convert the line to broad gauge. The work was completed in 1888. The extension of the main line from Nagpur to Asansol was completed by 1891. A 161-mile branch line (258 km) that connected Bilaspur to Umaria coal mine was built and linked to the existing line from Umaria to Katni (1891). By the turn of the twentieth century, work on the Calcutta–Bombay and Calcutta–Madras lines was completed. Through the first half of the twentieth century work on the BNR lines progressed steadily. In 1921 the Talcher coalfields were connected by a railway line starting from Nergundi. In 1931, the Raipur–Vizianagaram line was set up, which connected the east coast with the Central Province. By the end of the 1930s the BNR owned the largest narrow-gauge network in the country. The BNR management was taken over by the British Indian government on 1 October 1944. and continued to be called by that name until 14 April 1952, when it was amalgamated with the East Indian Railway to form one of six newly carved zones of the Indian Railways: the Eastern Railway.

Re-organisation

On 1 August 1955, the erstwhile Bengal Nagpur Railway portion was separated and a new zone, the South Eastern Railway, came into existence. In July 1967, the South Eastern Railway took over the Bankura Domodar River line.

Till April 2003, the South Eastern Railway comprised eight divisions: Kharagpur, Adra, Sambalpur, Khurda Road, Visakhapatnam, Chakradharpur, Bilaspur and Nagpur. In April 2003 two new zones were carved out from the SER. On 1 April 2003 the East Coast Railway (E.Co.R) comprising South Eastern Railway's Khurda Road, Sambalpur and Visakhapatnam divisions was dedicated to the nation; on 5 April 2003 the South East Central Railway (S.E.C.R) comprising South Eastern Railway's Nagpur and Bilaspur divisions and a new Raipur division was dedicated to the nation. On 13 April 2003 the SER reorganized Adra and Chakradharpur divisions to form the new Ranchi division. The South Eastern Railway has electric multiple unit sheds in Tikiapara, Kharagpur and Panskura. Electric locomotive sheds are in Santragachi, Tatanagar, Bokaro Steel City, Rourkela, Kharagpur and Bondamunda. Diesel locomotive sheds are located in Kharagpur, Bokaro Steel City, and Bondamunda.  The coach maintenance yard is in Santragachi. The South Eastern Railway has a major workshop located in Kharagpur.

Administration
The South Eastern Railway caters to the states of West Bengal, Jharkhand and Odisha. S.E. also runs regular electric multiple units (EMU) services to areas adjacent to Kolkata, from Howrah to Kharagpur, Amta, Medinipur, Tatanagar, Balasore, Rourkela and Santragachi to Shalimar. It also handles major freight traffic to Kolkata and Haldia and Howrah to Digha and Mecheda to Digha

Divisions
 Adra railway division
 Kharagpur railway division
 Chakradharpur railway division
 Ranchi railway division

Gallery

Loco sheds
 Electric Loco Shed, Tatanagar
 Electric Loco Shed, Bokaro Steel City
 Electric Loco Shed, Santragachi
 Electric Loco Shed, Rourkela
 Electric Loco Shed, Bondamunda
 Electric Loco Shed, Kharagpur
 Electric Loco Shed, Ispatnagar
 Diesel Loco Shed, Bondamunda

See also

 Howrah Station
 Eastern Railway zone
 Zones and divisions of Indian Railways
 All India Station Masters' Association (AISMA)

References

External links

Zones of Indian Railways
 
1955 establishments in West Bengal